Jangsan may refer to:

 Jangsan (Busan), a mountain in the South Korean city of Busan
 Jangsan (Gangwon), a mountain in the South Korean province of Gangwon-do
 Jangsan station, a railway station in the South Korean city of Busan